Poika means boy or son in Finnish and may refer to
Jukka Poika (born 1980), Finnish reggae artist
Pohjosen poika, a studio album by Finnish rapper Mikael Gabriel
Kersantin poika, a 1973 novel by Veijo Meri
Aatamin poika, a 1996 Finnish TV film drama 
Speedy Gonzales – noin 7 veljeksen poika, a 1970 Finnish western comedy
Bigi Poika, a resort in Suriname
Oranju Poika, a lake in India